The George Guida Sr. House is a historic U.S. home in Tampa, Florida. It is located at 1516 North Renfrew Avenue. On March 29, 2006, it was added to the U.S. National Register of Historic Places.

References

External links
 Weekly List Of Actions Taken On Properties: 3/27/06 Through 3/31/06 at National Register of Historic Places

Houses on the National Register of Historic Places in Hillsborough County, Florida
National Register of Historic Places in Tampa, Florida
Moderne architecture in Florida